Trips is an album by the American punk rock band Samiam, released in 2011.

It peaked at No. 42 on Billboard'''s Heatseekers Albums chart.

Critical receptionExclaim! wrote that "'80 West' is an upbeat opener, with simple, sweet melodies that remind how well singer Jason Beebout can deliver a hook." Philadelphia Weekly called the album "nearly the equal of [Samiam's] halcyon moment, 1994's Clumsy. The East Bay Express'' opined that "Beebout still sounds remarkably fresh, and the up-tempo, riff-based tunes have a lot of muscle."

Track listing

References

2011 albums
Samiam albums
Hopeless Records albums